The 2009–10 season of Dinamo București's 61st consecutive season in Liga I. In this season, Dinamo competed in Liga I, Cupa României and UEFA Europa League.

Dinamo played in the playoff for Europa League against Czech football club FC Slovan Liberec. In the first leg the supporters invaded the pitch causing the match to be abandoned in the 88th minute when the score was 2–0 for Slovan. The UEFA Control and Disciplinary Body awarded a default 0–3 defeat against Dinamo. One week later in Liberec Dinamo managed a memorable comeback and qualified in the Europa League 2009-10 Group Stage after winning 3–0 in Liberec after 90 and 120 minutes and winning 9–8 at penalties after 10 series. Andrei Cristea scored once and Marius Niculae twice. Dinamo was drawn in group F along Panathinaikos Athens, Galatasaray Istanbul and Sturm Graz. The first game was played against the Austrian team in Graz on 17 September and won 1–0 by the Red Dogs, but they eventually only won another game in the group, finishing 3rd in the group with two wins and four defeats. Dinamo finished the season 6th in Romania and qualified for the Europa League and were eliminated in the Cup semifinals. The season was another unsuccessful one despite defeating again rivals Steaua Bucharest twice and being most of the championship close to the leading position of the table.

Staff

Transfers

In

Out

Squad stats 

Outfield players

Disciplinary record

Results

Europe 

Play-off Europa League

Dinamo București 3–3 Slovan Liberec on aggregate. Dinamo București won 9–8 on penalties.

Group F

Non competitive matches

References 

2009-10
Romanian football clubs 2009–10 season